Phil Markowitz (born September 6, 1952 in Brooklyn, New York) is a jazz pianist and educator.

Discography

As leader
 Sno' Peas (Ken Music, 1991)
 In the Woods (Passsage, 1996)
 Taxi Ride (Passsage, 1998)
 Catalysis (Sunnyside, 2008)
 Perpetuity (Dot Time, 2014)

As sideman
With Chet Baker
 Love For Sale: Live At The Rising Sun Celebrity Club (Justin Time, 1978)
 Broken Wing (Sonopresse, 1979)
 Live at Chateauvalion, 1978 (France's Concert, 1989)
 Live at Fat Tuesday's (Fresh Sound, 1991)
 Stella by Starlight (Bandstand, 1992)

With Michael Davis
 Sidewalk Café (Voss, 1989)
 Midnight Crossing (Lipstick, 1994)
 Absolute Trombone (Hip Bone, 1997)
 Brass Nation (Hip Bone, 2000)
 New Brass (Hip Bone, 2002)
 Trumpets Eleven (Hip Bone, 2003)
 Absolute Trombone II (Hip Bone, 2007)

With Dave Liebman
 Turn It Around (Owl, 1992)
 Looking for the Light (CCB, 1992)
 Miles Away (Owl, 1995)
 Songs for My Daughter (Soul Note, 1995)
 Voyage (Evidence, 1996)
 Return of the Tenor/Standards (Double-Time, 1996)
 John Coltrane's Meditations (Arkadia, 1997)
 New Vista (Arkadia, 1997)
 Liebman Plays Puccini (Arkadia, 2001)
 Manhattan Dialogues (Zoho, 2005)

With Bob Mintzer
 Spectrum (DMP, 1988)
 Art of the Big Band (DMP, 1991)
 Departure (DMP, 1993)
 Only in New York (DMP, 1994)
 Big Band Trane (DMP, 1996)
 Latin from Manhattan (DMP, 1998)
 Quality Time (TVT, 1998)
 Homage to Count Basie (DMP, 2000)
 Gently (DMP, 2002)
 Live at MCG (MCG, 2004)
 In the Moment (Art of Life, 2006)
 Swing Out (MCG, 2007)

With others
 Randy Bernsen, Mo Wasabi (Zebra, 1986)
 Nick Brignola, Poinciana (Reservoir, 1998)
 Al Di Meola, Soaring Through a Dream (Manhattan, 1985)
 Jerry Hahn, Time Changes (Enja, 1995)
 Lionel Hampton, Mostly Ballads (Musicmasters, 1990)
 Jaroslav Jakubovič, Coincidence (VMM, 2009)
 Vic Juris, Night Tripper (SteepleChase, 1995)
 Vic Juris, Pastels (SteepleChase, 1996)
 Mel Lewis, Live in Israel
 Susan Osborn, Signature (Lifeline, 1983)
 Marvin Stamm, Bop Boy (Musicmasters, 1991)
 Jeff Tyzik, Jammin in Manhattan (Polydor, 1984)
 Jack Wilkins, You Can't Live Without It (Chiaroscuro, 1977)
 Jack Wilkins, Merge (Chiaroscuro, 1977)
 Paul Winter, Missa Gaia/Earth Mass (Living Music, 1982)

References

 Leonard Feather, Ira Gitler: The Biographical Encyclopedia of Jazz. Oxford University Press, Oxford usw. 1999;

External links
 Official site
 [ All Music]

1952 births
Living people
Place of birth missing (living people)
20th-century American male musicians
20th-century American pianists
21st-century American male musicians
21st-century American pianists
American jazz pianists
American male jazz musicians
American male pianists